A police burgh was a Scottish burgh which had adopted a "police system" for governing the town. They existed from 1833 to 1975.

The 1833 act
The first police burghs were created under the Burgh Police (Scotland) Act 1833 (3 & 4 Wm IV c.46). This act enabled existing royal burghs, burghs of regality, and burghs of barony to adopt powers of paving, lighting, cleansing, watching, supplying with water and improving their communities.

This preceded the Municipal Corporations Act 1835, which introduced a similar reform in England and Wales, by two years.

Forming a police burgh
In order for the act to be adopted in any burgh, an application by householders in the town had to be made for a poll to be held.  If three-quarters of qualified voters were in favour, the act would come into force in the burgh.  Inhabitants were also free to choose which parts of the act to adopt.

Boundaries
Contiguous burghs were allowed to unite for police burgh purposes. The boundaries agreed were recorded in the sheriff court books for the county.

Commissioners
A body of elected police commissioners was to administer the police burgh, between five and twenty-one in number. The chief magistrate of the existing burgh was to be, a commissioner. Commissioners were to be elected annually.

Powers and duties
The commissioners could, on applying the relevant sections of the act, collect and apply sums of money for the purposes of:
 employing collectors, clerks, constables, surveyors, police officers, watchmen, etc.
 purchasing lands
 lighting streets by gas or other means
 paving and cleansing streets
 distributing water and gas
 preventing infectious diseases

Parliamentary burghs
A further act was passed (3 & 4 Wm. IV, c.77; Parliamentary Burghs (Scotland) Act 1833) later in 1833 to extend local government to the thirteen burghs newly enfranchised by the Reform Act 1832. The inhabitants were permitted to elect magistrates and councillors and adopt a “general system of police”. The burghs thus created municipalities were:

Changes in legislation

The General Police (Scotland) Act 1847 (10 & 11 Vict. c.39) reduced the majority of householders required to adopt the police system from three quarters to two thirds.  It also allowed the parliamentary burghs to adopt the burgh police act, and to levy for money to carry out municipal government.

The Police of Towns (Scotland) Act 1850 (13 & 14 Vict. c.33) – also known as "Lock’s Act" – repealed much of the earlier legislation.  It also made it easier for police burghs to be created. Any "populous place" was now allowed to adopt a police system and become a burgh. A populous place was defined as any town, village, place or locality not already a burgh and with a population of 1,200 inhabitants or upwards. At the same time, a poll in favour of adopting the act now needed only a simple majority.

The General and Police Improvement (Scotland) Act 1862 (25 & 26 Vict. c.101) set out again the powers of police burghs.  It also introduced a system by which commissioners of burghs could apply to the county sheriff for an extension of the burgh boundaries.

The Burgh Police (Scotland) Act 1892 (55 & 56 Vict. c.55), which came into effect on 15 May 1893, superseded all earlier general and police acts in burghs. Each burgh was now united as a single body corporate for police and municipal purposes – in some cases, a previous royal burgh or burgh of barony or regality had continued to exist alongside the police burgh. Any remaining burghs of barony or regality that had not adopted the police acts were implicitly dissolved. Populous places that could become a burgh were now to have a population of 2,000 or more – though where a place with a lower population resolved to adopt the act, it was at the county sheriff’s discretion to allow or refuse such an application. Police commissioners were now to be retitled councillors, headed by a magistrate under whatever title was customary in the burgh.

The Town Councils (Scotland) Act 1900 (63 & 64 Vict. c.49) retitled the governing body of a burgh as "the provost, magistrates, and councillors" of the burgh. In certain burghs the title Lord Provost was to be continued.

The Burgh Police (Scotland) Act 1903 (3 Edw. VII. c.33) amended the 1892 Act and included a number of provisions relating to building within a burgh. The burgh was to maintain a register of plans and petitions (in modern terms a register of planning permissions). Permitted developments were to be issued building warrants by the town council, and the burgh surveyor was empowered to enforce the warrants and rectify unauthorised building. New powers were given to town councils in relation to the maintenance of footpaths and public rubbish bins, and the placing of advertisement hoardings and scaffolding. Minimum standards were set for the height and internal space of new buildings and on overcrowding, and for the width of streets. Powers were given to the burgh to make new streets and openings. Also included in the Act were various sundry powers and duties including the compulsory lighting of vehicles, licensing for billiard halls and ice cream shops, prohibition on betting in the street, powers on controlling milk supply, and penalties for littering.

The Local Government (Scotland) Act 1929 divided burghs, royal or police, into "large" and "small" burghs.

See also
 List of burghs in Scotland

References

 
Defunct types of subdivision in the United Kingdom